The Australian GT Production Car Championship was a CAMS sanctioned national motor racing title, organised by Procar Australia Pty Ltd, for drivers of Group 3E Series Production Cars. 

PROCAR had first promoted a national series for production based cars in 1994. This “Australian Super Production Car Series” accommodated numerous models (including high performance GT type cars) which were not eligible for the official Australian Production Car Championship, which at the time had tightened regulations in the interests of cost-control and was limited to vehicles with an engine capacity of less than 2.5 litres. The PROCAR series was renamed the “Australian GT Production Car Series” for 1995. For 1996 the series was given full CAMS national title status to become the Australian GT Production Car Championship while the Australian Production Car Championship itself was discontinued after the 1995 title.

In 2000 the “GT “cars were moved to a new Australian Nations Cup Championship with the remaining vehicles left to contest the Australian GT Production Car Championship. 2001 saw the Australian GT Production Car Championship contested in two parts with the higher performance “GT Performance” cars and the lesser “GT Production” cars running in separate races but still competing for an overall Australian GT Production Car Championship as well as separate class awards. In 2003 the “GT Performance” class cars competed for the first time for an official Australian GT Performance Car Championship whilst the former “GT Production” class cars would contest the newly re-instituted Australian Production Car Championship.

Since then the term GT Production was revived in 2008 as a sub-class of the Australian GT Championship, where it is broadly used to describe GT cars with origins closer to production cars than Grand Tourers.

Champions

Australian Super Production Car Series

Australian GT Production Car Series

Australian GT Production Car Championship

References
CAMS Manual of Motor Sport, 1996 through 2003 & 2006
www.camsmanual.com.au
www.procar.com.au

 
GT Production
GT Production